Jackie Smith (born April 3, 1968) is an American sociologist. She specializes in Political economy and Transnational organization social movements. Since 2011, she has been Professor of Sociology at the University of Pittsburgh. Smith currently serves as editor of the Journal of World-Systems Research, an official journal of the American Sociological Association and published by the University Library System, University of Pittsburgh. She is an advocate for the Open Access movement, arguing that scholarly societies should consider publishing options beyond those of major publishers. She is a leading advocate for building the Human Rights City worldwide movement.

She received her PhD from the University of Notre Dame in 1996. From 1997 to 2005, she was a professor at the Department of Sociology at the State University of New York. In 2005, she became an Associate Professor of Sociology and Peace Studies at the University of Notre Dame and a faculty member at the Kroc Institute for International Peace Studies. From 2008 to 2009, she directed the Center for the Study of Social Movements and Social Change.

She has published numerous articles, and published chapters and edited numerous books.

Selected works

References

External links
 Official website
 Jackie Smith, CV, July 21, 2011

1968 births
Living people
American sociologists
American women sociologists
University of Notre Dame faculty
University of Pittsburgh faculty
Academic journal editors
Writers about globalization
University of Notre Dame alumni
Women political writers
21st-century American women